Alba Trissina (fl. 1590) or Alba Tressina, was an Italian composer and nun. She was a Carmelite at the monastery of Santa Maria in Araceli in Vicenza, and studied with Leone Leoni, who also preserved and published four of her works. Leoni dedicated his Quarto Libro, 1622, to this pupil.

Works
Four motets for alto voice in Leoni's Sacri fiori: quarto libro de motettia are all of her compositions that survive.
 Vulnerasti cor meum A: her most noted work 
 Quaemadmodum A
 In nomine Iesu AA
 Anima mea AAT

References

1622 births
Italian Baroque composers
Italian women classical composers
Year of death missing
17th-century Italian composers
17th-century women composers
17th-century Italian Roman Catholic religious sisters and nuns
Carmelite nuns
People from Vicenza